William Moore Hadley (March 21, 1917 – June 29, 1992) is credited as being one of the primary early proponents of the middle school movement in the United States, and one of the first such schools carries his name.

Bill Hadley, the youngest child of Joseph William and Pauline Elizabeth Simmons Hadley, was born in Summerdale, Alabama, on March 21, 1917. He married Wilma (Polly) Funchess of Mobile, Alabama. Both Bill and Polly were students at Daphne State Normal School in Baldwin County, Alabama, at the time of their marriage. They both completed their teaching training and began their teaching careers in Baldwin County. Bill began teaching in 1937 and Polly in 1938. In 1942, he joined the Merchant Marines and served until the end of World War II. Polly continued to teach in the Baldwin and Mobile school systems and raised their two daughters. At the end of the War, Bill joined his family in Mobile where he and his wife resumed their teaching careers.

In 1948, he returned to the University of Alabama where he completed his B.S. and M.A. degrees. His wife was a principal and teacher in Tuscaloosa County, providing the means for her husband to complete his graduate degree in 1949. William Hadley accepted a position as State Supervisor of Education in the Alabama State Department in Montgomery, Alabama, in the Spring of 1949. Through the State Department of Education he was recommended for and received a full fellowship by the General Education Board of the Rockefeller Foundation to Teachers College, Columbia University, New York City, New York in the fall of 1949. He was employed as a full-time instructor on the staff of Teachers College during the academic year of 1950-51. He also completed his Doctoral Dissertation during that year.

Bill and Polly had three children: Carol Joan Hadley, born September 17, 1937, in Foley, Alabama; Rita Mable Hadley, born August 8, 1939, in Mobile, Alabama; and John William Hadley, born February 13, 1951, in New York City, New York. In June 1951 Bill accepted an Associate Professorship at the University of Texas at Austin, and he moved his family there. After 13-1/2 months at the University, he accepted the Superintendency of Schools in Alice, Texas, and two years later moved to Midland, Texas, as Superintendent of Schools there. The University of Alabama offered William the opportunity to make a study of the professional teaching personnel in Jefferson County, Alabama (including the city of Birmingham) on a contract basis. He accepted, completed the study, and then accepted his last professional post as Superintendent of Schools, Dist. #41, in Glen Ellyn, Illinois (1956-1974).

William Hadley underwent open heart surgery in 1973 and retired on total disability in June, 1974.  He was honored at his retirement by having an annual (perpetual) scholarship given in his name by the Glen Ellyn Schools, and a multimillion-dollar experimental middle or junior high school named in his honor, William M. Hadley School, located in Glen Ellyn, Illinois. The school is credited with being one of the first of its kind in the United States.

Bill and Polly moved to their retirement home in Magnolia Springs, Alabama, on July 1, 1974, where he lived until his death on June 29, 1992.

1917 births
1992 deaths
Schoolteachers from Alabama
University of Alabama people
University of Alabama alumni
20th-century American educators